Flintesønnerne is a 1956 Danish family film directed by Alice O'Fredericks.

Cast
Poul Reichhardt as Jesper Poulsen
Peter Malberg as Mikkel
Ib Mossin as Viggo
Ebbe Langberg as Martin
Hanne Winther-Jørgensen - Karen
Astrid Villaume as Anna
Valdemar Skjerning as Kresten Flint
Tove Maës as Else Flint
Agnes Phister-Andresen as aunt Jane
Helga Frier as Grete
Ove Rud as Hans
Keld Markuslund as Mads
Einar Juhl as the Sandbjerg man
Irene Hansen as Vera
Per Lauesgaard as Karl
Annelis Morten Hansen as Rikke
Børge Møller Grimstrup as a farmer
Mogens Juul as Jacob
Inga Hansen

References

External links

1956 films
Danish children's films
1950s Danish-language films
Films directed by Alice O'Fredericks
Films scored by Sven Gyldmark
ASA Filmudlejning films
Danish romantic comedy films
1956 romantic comedy films